Football Club Alga Bishkek is a Kyrgyz professional football club based in Bishkek, that competes in the Kyrgyz Premier League, the top flight of Football in Kyrgyzstan.  The club plays its home games at Dynamo Stadion.

History
Alga Bishkek were established in Frunze during 1947, as FC Zenith Frunze. At the end of the 2005 season, the club, now called FC SKA-Shoro Bishkek, folded. In 2007 the club was reformed as FC Aviator AAL Bishkek, but last only half a season before ceasing operations. In 2010 the club was again reformed, this time under their previous name FC Alga Bishkek.

Name history
1947: Founded as FC Zenit Frunze.
1950: Renamed FC Trudovye Rezervy Frunze.
1953: Renamed FC Iskra Frunze.
1955: Renamed FC Spartak Frunze.
1961: Renamed FC Alga Frunze.
1992: Renamed FC Alga Bishkek.
1993: Renamed FC Alga-RIIF Bishkek.
1994: Renamed FC Alga Bishkek.
1996: Renamed FC Alga-PVO Bishkek.
1998: Renamed FC SKA-PVO Bishkek.
2004: Renamed FC SKA-Shoro Bishkek.
2005: Dissolved.
2007: Reformed as FC Aviator AAL Bishkek.
2007: Dissolved.
2010: Reformed as FC Alga Bishkek.

Domestic history

Continental history

Players

Current squad

Managerial history

Honours

Domestic
Kyrgyzstan League
Champions (5): 1992, 1993, 2000, 2001, 2002
Kyrgyzstan Cup
Winners (9): 1992, 1993, 1997, 1998, 1999, 2000, 2001, 2002, 2003

References

 Alga squad

External links
Career stats by KLISF
Summer transfers 2012

Football clubs in Kyrgyzstan
Football clubs in Bishkek
Association football clubs established in 1947